Otoyol 3, also known as the European Motorway and abbreviated as the O-3 is a  long otoyol in East Thrace, Turkey. The O-3 runs from Edirne to Istanbul and is the only motorway in Turkey located entirely in Europe. The motorway begins west of Edirne at a junction with the  where it then continues as a beltway passing just north of Edirne. From there, the motorway passes through mostly rural farmland until it enters the Istanbul metropolis near Silivri.

The motorway has six lanes, three in each direction, except for a  section between Silivri and Esenyurt.

Exit list
{| class="wikitable"
|-
!width=100| Province !!width=100| District !!width=40| km !!width=40| mi !!width=30| Exit !!width=300| Destination !!width=200| Notes
|-
|rowspan="5"| Edirne
|rowspan="4"| Edirne Merkez
|style='background: #dcdcdc'| 0
|style='background: #dcdcdc'| 0
|style='background: #ffddf4'| K1
|style='background: #ffddf4'|  — Kapıkule
|style='background: #ffddf4'| Westbound only
|-
|style='background: #dcdcdc'| 11.5
|style='background: #dcdcdc'| 7.1
|| K2
||  — Edirne
|| 
|-
|style='background: #dcdcdc'| 15.8
|style='background: #dcdcdc'| 9.8
|| K3
||  via eastern connector
||
|-
|style='background: #dcdcdc'| 16.7
|style='background: #dcdcdc'| 10.3
|colspan="3" style='background: #ccccff; text-align:center;'| Edirne Toll Plaza
|-
|| Havsa
|style='background: #dcdcdc'| 35.7
|style='background: #dcdcdc'| 22.1
|style='background: #ccccff'| K4
|style='background: #ccccff'|  — Havsa
|style='background: #ccccff'|
|-
|rowspan="2"| Kırklareli
|| Babaeski
|style='background: #dcdcdc'| 62.9
|style='background: #dcdcdc'| 39
|style='background: #ccccff'| K5
|style='background: #ccccff'|  — Babaeski, Kırklareli
|style='background: #ccccff'|
|-
|| Lüleburgaz
|style='background: #dcdcdc'| 87.3
|style='background: #dcdcdc'| 54.2
|style='background: #ccccff'| K6
|style='background: #ccccff'|  — Lüleburgaz
|style='background: #ccccff'|
|-
|rowspan="2"| Tekirdağ 
|| Saray
|style='background: #dcdcdc'| 116.1
|style='background: #dcdcdc'| 72.1
|style='background: #ccccff'| K7
|style='background: #ccccff'|  — , Saray
|style='background: #ccccff'| 
|-
|| Çorlu
|style='background: #dcdcdc'| 136.3
|style='background: #dcdcdc'| 84.6
|style='background: #ccccff'| K8
|style='background: #ccccff'|  — Çorlu, Velimeşe
|style='background: #ccccff'|
|-
|rowspan="27"| Istanbul
|rowspan="4"| Silivri
|style='background: #dcdcdc'| 154.8
|style='background: #dcdcdc'| 96.1
|style='background: #ccccff'| K9
|style='background: #ccccff'|  — Çerkezköy
|style='background: #ccccff'|
|-
|style='background: #dcdcdc'| 167.1
|style='background: #dcdcdc'| 103.8
|style='background: #ccccff'| K10
|style='background: #ccccff'|  — Sancaktepe
|-
|style='background: #dcdcdc'| 174.3
|style='background: #dcdcdc'| 108.3
|style='background: #ccccff'| K11
|style='background: #ccccff'| TEM connector — Silivri
|style='background: #ccccff'|
|-
|style='background: #dcdcdc'| 186.1
|style='background: #dcdcdc'| 115.6
|style='background: #ccccff'| K12
|style='background: #ccccff'| Selimpaşa connector — Selimpaşa
|style='background: #ccccff'|
|-
|rowspan="2"| Büyükçekmece
|style='background: #dcdcdc'| 193.6
|style='background: #dcdcdc'| 120.2
|style='background: #ccccff'| K13
|style='background: #ccccff'| Kumburgaz connector — Kumburgaz
|style='background: #ccccff'|
|-
|style='background: #dcdcdc'| 199.6
|style='background: #dcdcdc'| 124
|style='background: #ccccff'| K14
|style='background: #ccccff'|  — Çatalca
|style='background: #ccccff'|
|-
|rowspan="2"| Esenyurt 
|style='background: #dcdcdc'| 211.7
|style='background: #dcdcdc'| 131.5
|style='background: #ccccff'| K15
|style='background: #ccccff'|  — Hadımköy
|style='background: #ccccff'|
|-
|style='background: #dcdcdc'| 223.8
|style='background: #dcdcdc'| 139
|style='background: #ccccff'| K16
|style='background: #ccccff'| Avcılar-H.dere connector — Esenyurt
|style='background: #ccccff'|
|-
|| Avcılar
|style='background: #dcdcdc'| 226.8
|style='background: #dcdcdc'| 140.9
|style='background: #ccccff'| K17
|style='background: #ccccff'| Ispartakule Blv. — Avcılar
|style='background: #ccccff'|
|-
|| Küçükçekmece/Başakşehir
|style='background: #dcdcdc'| 234.5
|style='background: #dcdcdc'| 145.7
|colspan="3" style='background: #ccccff; text-align:center;'| Mahmutbey Toll Plaza
|-
|rowspan="7"| Bağcılar
|style='background: #dcdcdc'| 235.7
|style='background: #dcdcdc'| 146.4
|| K18
||  -YSS Bridge, Atatürk International Airport
|connector to the 
|-
|style='background: #dcdcdc'| 236.8
|style='background: #dcdcdc'| 147.1
|style='background: #ffddf4'| -
|style='background: #ffddf4'| Köprü Cd.
|style='background: #ffddf4'| Eastbound exit and entrance only
|-
|style='background: #dcdcdc'| 237.3
|style='background: #dcdcdc'| 147.4
|style='background: #ffddf4'| -
|style='background: #ffddf4'| Northern Service Rd.
|style='background: #ffddf4'| Westbound exit only
|-
|style='background: #dcdcdc'| 237.8
|style='background: #dcdcdc'| 147.7
|style='background: #ffddf4'| -
|style='background: #ffddf4'| Mahmutbey Rd.
|style='background: #ffddf4'| Westbound exit only
|-
|style='background: #dcdcdc'| 238.4
|style='background: #dcdcdc'| 148.1
|| K19
||  (Istanbul 2nd Bltwy) — FSM Bridge, Kozyatağı
|| 
|-
|style='background: #dcdcdc'| 238.7
|style='background: #dcdcdc'| 148.3
|style='background: #ffddf4'| -
|style='background: #ffddf4'| Hüseyin Karaaslan Cd.
|style='background: #ffddf4'| Eastbound exit and entrance, westbound entrance
|-
|style='background: #dcdcdc'| 239.5
|style='background: #dcdcdc'| 148.8
|style='background: #ffddf4'| -
|style='background: #ffddf4'| Matbaacılar Cd. / South Service Rd.
|style='background: #ffddf4'| Eastbound entrance, westbound exit
|-
|rowspan="5"| Esenler
|style='background: #dcdcdc'| 240.6
|style='background: #dcdcdc'| 149.5
|style='background: #FFDDF4'| -
|style='background: #FFDDF4'| Köyiçi Cd.
|style='background: #FFDDF4'| Eastbound exit, westbound exit
|-
|style='background: #dcdcdc'| 240.9
|style='background: #dcdcdc'| 149.6
|style='background: #FFDDF4'| -
|style='background: #FFDDF4'| Karaoğlanoğlu Cd.
|style='background: #FFDDF4'| Westbound entrance
|-
|style='background: #dcdcdc'| 241.6
|style='background: #dcdcdc'| 150.1
|style='background: #FFDDF4'| -
|style='background: #FFDDF4'| Mehmt Akif Ersoy Cd.
|style='background: #FFDDF4'| Eastbound entrance
|-
|style='background: #dcdcdc'| 241.8
|style='background: #dcdcdc'| 150.2
|style='background: #FFDDF4'| -
|style='background: #FFDDF4'| Atışalanı Cd.
|style='background: #FFDDF4'| Westbound exit
|-
|style='background: #dcdcdc'| 242.4
|style='background: #dcdcdc'| 150.6
|| K20
|| Metris-Esenler connector
|| 
|-
|rowspan="5"| Bayrampaşa
|style='background: #dcdcdc'| 243.8
|style='background: #dcdcdc'| 151.4
|style='background: #FFDDF4'| -
|style='background: #FFDDF4'| 50. Yıl Cd.
|style='background: #FFDDF4'| Westbound exit
|-
|style='background: #dcdcdc'| 244.7
|style='background: #dcdcdc'| 152
|style='background: #ffddf4'| -
|style='background: #ffddf4'| Ulus Sk.
|style='background: #ffddf4'| Eastbound entrance
|-
|style='background: #dcdcdc'| 245
|style='background: #dcdcdc'| 152.2
|| -
|| Abdi İpekçi Cd.
||
|-
|style='background: #dcdcdc'| 246.4
|style='background: #dcdcdc'| 153.1
|| -
||  (Istanbul 1st Bltwy) — Bosphorus Bridge, Kadıköy /  — Bakırköy
|| 
|-
|style='background: #dcdcdc'| 246.9
|style='background: #dcdcdc'| 153.4
|| -
|| Adnan Menderes Blv. — Fatih
|| Transition into Boulevard

See also
 List of motorways in Turkey

References

 Turkish General Directorate of Highways. Turkey road map. 2009.

External links

AH1
03
Transport in Edirne Province
Transport in Kırklareli Province
Transport in Tekirdağ Province
Transport in Istanbul Province
Toll roads in Turkey